Kerry Taylor may refer to:
Kerry Taylor (baseball) (born 1971), Major League Baseball pitcher
Kerry Taylor (American football) (born 1989)
Kerry Taylor (businesswoman), British auctioneer